Scott D. Smith (born March 26, 1953) is an American sound engineer. He has been nominated for two Academy Awards in the category Best Sound. He has worked on over 60 films since 1975.

Selected filmography
 Under Siege (1992)
 The Fugitive (1993)

References

External links

1953 births
Living people
American audio engineers
Artists from Chicago
Best Sound BAFTA Award winners
Engineers from Illinois